A systematic review notes that children with COVID-19 have milder effects and better prognoses than adults. However, children are susceptible to "multisystem inflammatory syndrome in children" (MIS-C), a rare but life-threatening systemic illness involving persistent fever and extreme inflammation following exposure to the SARS-CoV-2 virus.

As a vulnerable population, children and youth may be affected by COVID-19 pandemic policies implemented, including education, mental health, safety, and socioeconomic stability; the infection of the virus may lead to separation or loss of their family. As with many other crises, the COVID-19 pandemic may compound existing vulnerabilities and inequalities experienced by children.

Illness 
When a child is infected with COVID-19, they are more likely to have an asymptomatic case, or one that is mild to moderate in severity. They are less likely to become infected or hospitalized than adults. Several explanations contributing to the milder COVID-19 symptoms experienced by children have been suggested, including: a lower expression of ACE-2 (the receptor used by SARS-CoV-2 for cell entry) in the respiratory tract in younger children; viral interference, e.g. by other coronaviruses; cross-reactive immune responses (e.g. antibodies, CD8+ and/or CD4+ T-cells reactive to other viral antigens than of SARS-CoV-2); and some protection offered from an increased Th2-response.

Severe illness is possible, and in these instances respiratory support, such as a ventilator, may be required. Some children have experienced multiple organ failure. Such severe or critical cases were most common among children with certain underlying conditions, such as for example, asthma (and especially more severe cases of asthma) or those with weakened immune systems. Children are associated with lower mortality rates than other age groups, when infected with COVID-19. They are more likely to experience gastrointestinal symptoms than adults.

The most common symptoms among children include fever symptoms, followed by a dry cough. Other commonly reported symptoms among children include nasal congestion or runniness, fatigue, and headache. Some evidence suggests that many children who become ill develop long COVID.

Early into the pandemic, dermatologists reported an increase in chilblains-like lesions in children, especially on their feet, fingers, and toes. It has been informally referred to as "COVID toes". This was presumed related to COVID-19 infection, however confirming that a child has been infected can be difficult.

Some children who become infected develop a rare condition known as MIS-C, short for "multisystem inflammatory syndrome in children". This causes a persistent fever and extreme inflammation. Other symptoms associated with MIS-C include severe abdominal pain and hypotension.

Education

School closures 

By the end of March 2020, UNESCO estimated that over 89% of the world's student population was out of school or university due to closures aimed at mitigating the spread of COVID-19. This raised serious concerns regarding the social, economic, and educational impacts of protracted school closures on students. In addition, school closures disproportionately affect children from low-income or minority families, children with disabilities, and young women, due to disparities in access to distance education, unequal distribution of increased child-care and domestic responsibilities, and the fact that school subsidized meal programs and vaccinations are cornerstones of child healthcare for many families. For example, school closures during the 2014–2016 Ebola outbreak in West Africa increased school dropouts, rates of child labor, violence against children, and teen pregnancies.

Accoirding to a report nearly all children have fallen behind during the Covid pandemic. Loneliness, boredom and misery became "endemic" among youngsters while their physical and mental health went into decline. The UK’s chief inspector of schools, Amanda Spielman said that some young children had fallen behind in their language skills, struggled to interact with their peers socially and lost physical dexterity and confidence through a lack of practice while confined to their homes.

Impact on student life 

A comprehensive global study (Aristovnik et al., 2020) provides systematic meaningful insights into students’ satisfaction and perception of different aspects of their lives during the first wave of the pandemic, including their opinions on the immediate and distant future. The study found that teaching staff and universities’ public relations offered students the most important support at the university during the pandemic. On the other hand, the lack of computer skills and the perception of a relatively higher workload prevented students from perceiving a higher performance while adapting to online learning.

During the lockdown, students primarily raised concerns about their future professional career and study issues and were mainly bored, anxious, and frustrated. They also changed some of their hygienic behaviours such as regularly wearing masks and washing hands, and daily routine habits like leaving home and shaking hands.

While the role of both hospitals and universities appears to be positive, governments and banks did not meet the students’ expectations during the pandemic.

Socio-demographic (and geographic) factors also played an important role in the students’ perception of different aspects of academic work/life. The empirical results suggest that the transition from onsite to online lectures due to the COVID-19 crisis had a stronger effect on males, part-time students, undergraduate students, applied sciences students, students with a lower living standard, and students from less developed regions (in Africa and Asia), while the pandemic generally had a greater effect on students who were female, full-time, undergraduate and had financial problems with respect to their emotional life and personal circumstances. The results also demonstrate that more hopeful and less bored students, students who were more satisfied with their academic work/life, social science students, students with a better living standard (with a scholarship and/or the ability to pay the overall costs of study), and those who were studying in Europe showed greater satisfaction with the role and measures of their university during the COVID-19 crisis.

A Reuters national survey conducted in the US indicated serious mental health consequences resulting from school shutdowns and the pandemic. This affected both students and their teachers. 90% of school districts surveyed said that their district was experiecing higher "absenteeism or disengagement", and 74% of districts indicated increasing mental stress among students.

Health and development 
Increased stress for parents and caretakers, risk of infection, and social isolation threaten the health and development of children, and can contribute to adverse childhood experiences. Stressful pressures such as these can negatively impact a child's neurological development, especially in infancy or early childhood, including as a contributor to depression in adulthood. Academics have expressed concern that the development of infants which spent much of the first year of their lives in particular under lockdown may have been hampered by reduced social contact.

A report in The Lancet indicated that the COVID-19 would indirectly result in elevated maternal deaths and infant mortality, due to disrupted access to healthcare and food. According to the report, "Our least severe scenario ... over 6 months would result in 253,500 additional child deaths and 12,200 additional maternal deaths." Children risk losing caregivers to COVID-19. The pandemic and its consequences can cause decreased access to resources such as water, social work or medical care for vulnerable populations. Poverty among children has increased. Long-term physical inactivity resulting from social distancing and lockdown measures result in less physical fitness for children, including higher childhood obesity and disruption of sleep patterns. Lack of physical access to school resources can also heighten food insecurity for poor students.

Additional millions of children worldwide are expected by UNICEF to experience food insecurity and malnourishment. Immunization efforts regarding diseases other than COVID-19 have been impacted, which will increase child deaths. According to UNICEF, over 94 million children were expected to miss measles shots, and an increase in HIV infections among children was expected if health services were disrupted. Stillbirths are expected to increase, due to disrupted access to health services.

Mental health 

Children around the world have been affected by the pandemic and lockdown in several ways. Some children count on the right support and resources, making the situation manageable, while others strive to keep up with school activities in this new reality. School closures made children face considerable challenges to learn at home. Children in families that cannot afford resources for home learning activities, where parents have low levels of educational attainment, or where there is inadequate space for effective learning, have definitely fallen behind during this period.

Studies performed in past epidemics, such as SARS, EBOLA virus and Middle-East respiratory syndrome have shown a high prevalence of negative psychological effects not only in children, but also in adults. The same is going on with COVID-19 pandemic and while confined in quarantine, some of the predoniman new-onset psychological problems in children and adults are anxiety, depression, irritability, boredom, inattention and fear.

Drug and alcohol abuse among minors fell during the pandemic, as did arrests. Mental health visits saw a 24% increase for children ages 5 to 11, and 31% for older minors. Many children became more vulnerable to mental health conditions such as depression and anxiety due to the pandemic and its consequences, among which social isolation has been a contributing factor to a decline in mental health quality. Zanonia Chiu, a psychologist from Hong Kong, said about depressed children: "Now that schools are closed, some lock themselves up inside their rooms for weeks, refusing to take showers, eat, or leave their beds." Increased rates of domestic violence were reported during the pandemic, and this has included an elevated risk of child abuse internationally.

Apart from psychological problems, there is evidence that the lockdown has also had an impact on children and adolescents’ cognition and social abilities. Studies from Europe suggest that the COVID-19 pandemic has impacted families caring for children with intellectual and developmental disabilities (IDDs) even more than the pandemic has impacted the general population. Parents of children with mental and physical disabilities were more likely to report changes in their child's behaviour, such as distractibility, inability to concentrate, irritability and general discomfort.

Impact on children and adolescents

Many young people who use mental health services are already unable to access essential mental health support. Sessions have been replaced with online or telephone support or even postponed. Some young people may find this less effective or may worry about maintaining privacy if sessions are held remotely with family members close by. Apart from these challenges and difficulties, lockdown and social distancing have also impacted particular populations. In the research “Professionals’ perspectives on the effects of COVID-19 on autistic individuals”, it is stated that individuals with autism spectrum disorder are at heightened risk of experiencing difficulties coping with the pandemic and resultant measures. Students with autism have to struggle with abrupt changes to course delivery and mentorship programmes due to school closures. Many individuals with autism require support, yet services have been paused temporarily. Some individuals with autism spectrum disorder stated that the lockdown had meant they could engage in hobbies more easily, yet the loss of routines and activities was considered difficult and stressful.

Lockdown was deemed to have impacted on individuals with autism spectrum disorder's educations, social lives, activities and health. For some, abrupt changes to education had been unexpectedly beneficial; for example, not attending school was better for their mental health, resulting in less anxiety managing their own school work. Social distancing made them also feel relieved since they have enjoyed not having the pressure to socialize. Lockdown was described as useful as they could choose their day-to-day routines around food and personal hobbies. However, some individuals with autism spectrum disorder have found studying at home problematic, they had difficulties meeting with friends and family as they would wish, some of them have experienced difficulties keeping to a structured routine and filling their daily routines with meaningful activities. They had regressed in their progress due to being unable to leave the house.

The marked uncertainty of the pandemic and associated disruptions in routine may be also particularly deleterious for children with IDD, who often benefit from heightened structure, clear expectations and an array of services, and may have difficulty understanding changes necessitated by COVID-19.

Children and adolescents may also experience mental health problems due to the COVID-19 pandemic itself, such as increased anxiety, as they might fear that they or their loved ones will get infected or they might worry about the future of the world. Significantly more children reported severe anxiety and severe sleep-related impairment during the COVID-19 lockdown than before COVID-19. The results of this study confirm the suspicions of child and youth care professionals that the COVID-19 lockdown has negative effects on the mental and social health of children and adolescents. In opinion papers, professionals elaborated on the vulnerability of this group and expected more feelings of loneliness, anxiety and depression, as well as a more tense atmosphere at home. Concerns were also expressed that the COVID-19 lockdown would lead to an increase in inequality and that children and families with lower socioeconomic status would be more susceptible to mental health issues. Although this study could not definitely confirm these concerns, children from single-parent families, from families with three or more children, and with parents who had a negative change in work situation reported more mental and social health problems during the COVID-19 lockdown. This study showed that children and adolescents reported poorer mental and social health during the COVID-19 lockdown compared to before and exposed several risk factors for poor mental and social health.

Other research highlights the importance of other highly impacted aspects, such as violence, situations of uncertainty, fear or anxiety, the risk of children having physical problems derived from a rise in sedentariness, in time in front of the screens, in unhealthy diets and in the detriment of sleep quality. Those situations can intensify during quarantine and provoke an increase in obesity and a loss of the cardiorespiratory capacity.

There is concern over the exclusion of children without digital access and other resources that supported their learning during quarantine. Evidence suggests that there has been a deficit in curriculum coverage and half of parents were engaged with their children's home learning. This represents a concern among teachers since the variability in engagement with the curriculum will potentially have different effects on the development and mental health of students.

Relevant findings in different countries

There is also evidence that shows some children are having poor speech development as a result of lack of social contact with peers, social distancing and the wearing of face masks.

The English Endowment Foundation has collected Data from 50,000 pupils and carried out a survey of schools across England that have shown an increased number of four- and five-year-olds needing help with language. Some of the results were that 96% said pupils starting school in September 2020 needed more support with communication than in previous years. This research is one of the first to also provide evidence about the extent of learning loss as the result of school closures. This study found that the overall performance in both mathematics and reading were significantly lower in comparison to the children's performance on standardisation samples in 2017. These primary findings are part of an ongoing research which plans to collect further data until September 2021.

Even though children and adolescents were not highly affected by the pandemic, social isolation measures had an impact on them. A prospective, descriptive and cross sectional study funded by the National University of Comahue in San Carlos de Bariloche, Argentina, which assessed changes in the sleeping habits, screen use, sports-related activities, eating and medical consultation stated that lockdown produced an emotional and behavioural impact on children and adolescents. The emotional and behavioural changes include boredom, irritability, reluctance, anger and changes in sleep pattern. What is more, the use of screens in their leisure time increased by 3 hours on weekdays. The type of physical activities also changed: swimming and team sports changed to biking, walking and skiing.

A study carried out in Italy and Spain stated that parents noticed emotional behavioural changes in their children during confinement. However, in Italy 83.8% of parents noticed those changes, while in Spain, 88.9% of parents observed them. This is due to the increased flexibility of lockdown in Italy. As for the changes reported by parents, children and adolescents showed boredom, irritability, reluctance, anger and anxiety, which lead to arguments with the rest of the family, concentration difficulties and frustration. This study is the first one developed to examine the psychological impact of the COVID-19 quarantine on children and adolescents. These two countries are two of the most affected by COVID-19 and this study aimed at examining the emotional well-being of Italian and Spanish adolescents between 3 and 18 in order to provide parents and caregivers with useful advice and guidelines to reduce the impact of the quarantine on the youth.

Measures taken to lessen the impact of quarantine on children and adolescents

Some authors have reflected on the possible effects of the COVID-19 quarantine on children and adolescents. Wang and colleagues highlight the need for awareness of the quarantine's potential effects on children's mental health, and the importance for governments, non-governmental organizations, the community, schools, and parents to act to reduce the possible effects of this situation. Special attention should be paid to children and adolescents who are separated from their caregivers who are infected or suspected of being infected, and those whose caregivers are infected or have died, because they are more vulnerable to psychological problems.

To mitigate this far-reaching and significant negative impact on the psychological wellbeing of children, multifaceted age and developmentally appropriate strategies are required to be adopted by health care authorities.

A study carried out by Dialnet in The Basque country analysed the assessment of professionals working with children on the impact of quarantine on the health and health inequalities of the child population, as well as the importance given to the intermediate factors that can modulate the impact of the experience of lockdown on children's health. Health and socio-educational professionals who work with children were surveyed in order to identify and measure the impact on children's health. Furthermore, this multidisciplinar contribution allowed them to determine whether this professional's perspective entailed a different opinion in the face of the health consequences.

Children's experience and understanding 
Commentators noted that many very young children developed a understanding of reality based largely on the limited world of pandemic life. Taken out of formal childcare and separated from other children they often forgot their old friends. Whilst, previously everyday activities such as visiting a shop or relative's home became exotic. However, even if they couldn't clearly recollect it most young children which were born in the pre COVID-19 world retained some awareness of it.

A study of seven to twelve year olds in the UK, Spain, Canada, Sweden, Brazil and Australia understanding of the pandemic found that more than half of children knew a significant amount about COVID-19. They associated the topic with various negative emotions saying it made them feel “worried”, “scared”, “angry” and “confused”. They tended to be aware of the types of people which were most vulnerable to the virus and the restrictions which were enforced in their communities. Many had learned new terms and phrases in relation to the pandemic such as social distancing. They were most commonly informed about COVID-19 by teachers and parents but also learned about the subject from friends, television and the internet.

Impact on most at-risk groups 
Child safety is at risk during the pandemic. Children who are living in unsanitary and crowded conditions are particularly at risk. Youth – especially young women, indigenous peoples, migrants, and refugees – face heightened socioeconomic and health impacts and an increased risk of gender-based violence due to social isolation, discrimination and increased financial stress. They are also more prone to child marriage as families seek ways to alleviate economic burdens.

Although reports of child abuse in the US declined by an average of 40.6% from April 2019 to April 2020, child welfare advocates suggest that this drop is an under-reporting artifact secondary to the closure of schools and daycare centers, where most reports of child abuse are made. The Rape, Abuse & Incest National Network reported in April 2020 that for the first time, over half of the victims calling their National Sexual Assault Hotline for help were minors.

Impact on young migrants 
This global crisis is exacerbating existing vulnerabilities and inequalities experienced by young people, amplified in humanitarian contexts where fragility, conflict, and emergencies have undermined institutional capacity and where there is limited access to services. Particularly affected are:  young migrants; young people who are internally displaced or refugees; young people living in poor, high-density urban areas; young people without a home; young people living with disabilities; and those living with HIV. Young people separated from, unaccompanied, or left behind by migrant working parents face higher risks of exploitation, violence, and mental health issues, as well as poor access to health services and protection.

Vaccines 
As of September 22, 2020, no vaccine trials were being conducted on children under the age of 18 years. According to the CDC, adolescents ages 16 or 17 are eligible for the Pfizer COVID-19 vaccine, but not the Moderna or Janssen (Johnson & Johnson) vaccines. As of March 2021, Moderna and Pfizer/Biotech had begun conducting vaccine trials for children, and Johnson & Johnson planned to do so as well.

On December 22, 2021, the UK Medicines and Healthcare products Regulatory Agency (MHRA) has approved a new paediatric formulation of the Pfizer BioNTech COVID-19 vaccine for children aged 5 to 11 in United Kingdom.

On June 19, 2022, the U.S. Food and Drug Administration (FDA) has authorized for emergency use both the Pfizer-BioNTech COVID-19 vaccine and the Moderna vaccine for children 6 months to 5 years old.

References

Sources 
 

children
Childhood
Pediatrics